The 2000 NAIA Division I women's basketball tournament was the tournament held by the NAIA to determine the national champion of women's college basketball among its Division I members in the United States and Canada for the 1999–2000 basketball season.

In a rematch of the 1999 NAIA Division I final, defending champions Oklahoma City defeated Simon Fraser in the championship game again, 64–55, to claim the Stars' third NAIA national title. This would go on to be the second of four consecutive titles for Oklahoma City. 

The tournament was played at the Oman Arena in Jackson, Tennessee.

Qualification

The tournament field remained fixed at thirty-two teams, with the top sixteen teams receiving seeds. 

The tournament continued to utilize a simple single-elimination format.

Bracket

See also
2000 NAIA Division I men's basketball tournament
2000 NCAA Division I women's basketball tournament
2000 NCAA Division II women's basketball tournament
2000 NCAA Division III women's basketball tournament
2000 NAIA Division II women's basketball tournament

References

NAIA
NAIA Women's Basketball Championships
2000 in sports in Tennessee